Marie Gaudin, Dame de La Bourdaisière (1495-1580), was a French lady-in-waiting, known as the lover of king Francis I of France and Pope Leo X. 

She was married to Philibert Babou. 

She served as lady-in-waiting to the queen of France, Eleanor of Austria. 

She was the mistress of Francis I of France in the very beginning of his reign, but their relationship never became public. 

In 1515, she accompanied the French king to his meeting with the Pope in Bologna, during which she had an affair with the Pope, Leo X. The Pope gifted her a diamond known since as Diamant Gaudin.

References

Mistresses of Francis I of France
Papal mistresses
French ladies-in-waiting
1495 births
1580 deaths